Tank Washington is an American rapper and emcee from Austin, Texas who has worked with artists like King Mez, Dee-1, ST 2 Lettaz, Stunnaman, GLC, Max Frost & Killa Kyleon.

Career

Tank's first official release came as a member of the hiphop group Impac under the Austin independent music label Above All Entertainment with distribution from Tower Records' 33rd Street Records. In 2013, Washington released his first solo project, the 6 Shots EP, and performed as part of LNS Crew for Fun Fun Fun Fest. He was featured on the LNS Crew mixtape release during 2015; the year also marked his father's passing from lung cancer. In 2016, Tank Washington released his album PAIN and had his debut solo set as an official SXSW Showcase Artist. In 2017, Tank performed with his brother Kydd Jones at Sound on Sound Fest. In 2018, Washington released his new album 183.

References

Rappers from Texas
Living people
Musicians from Austin, Texas
Year of birth missing (living people)
Singers from Texas
Songwriters from Texas
American hip hop singers
African-American male rappers
African-American songwriters
Southern hip hop musicians
21st-century American singers
21st-century African-American male singers
Alternative hip hop musicians
American hip hop musicians
21st-century American rappers
21st-century American male singers
American male songwriters